Evert Tennis Academy is a tennis training center for developing collegiate and professional tennis players in Boca Raton, Florida. The academy was founded by professional tennis player Chris Evert and her brother John Evert. It opened in 1996.

The center offers part-time training options and academic and housing options for students who are enrolled full-time. Full-time students have the option to take online school or go to Boca Prep International School, which is located across the street from the academy.

History
Evert Tennis Academy started a collaboration with Tennis World USA. The partnership began in February 2015. During March of 2015, Evert Tennis Academy students competed in nine United States Tennis Association Florida Level 6 tournament finals.

Boca West Country Club renewed their partnership with Evert Tennis Academy in late 2019.

In February 2020, Evert Tennis Academy partnered with Grandview Preparatory School to provide high schools students and full-time training athletes with a custom education program with personalized teaching methods.

People

Coaches

Alumni

See also
 Delray Beach Tennis Center

References

External links
 

Tennis academies
Tennis venues in Florida
1996 establishments in Florida
Sports venues in Boca Raton, Florida
Sports venues completed in 1996